Events in the year 2021 in São Tomé and Príncipe.

Incumbents
President: Evaristo Carvalho
Prime Minister: Jorge Bom Jesus

Events
Ongoing — COVID-19 pandemic in São Tomé and Príncipe
18 July – 2021 São Toméan presidential election: As no presidential candidate received a majority of the vote, a second round was originally scheduled to be held on 8 August 2021. Following an objection to the first-round result, the second round was postponed to 29 August 2021, and later postponed again to 5 September 2021
5 September – The second round was won by Carlos Vila Nova of Independent Democratic Action, who received 58% of the vote, defeating Guilherme Posser da Costa of the MLSTP–PSD.

See also
List of years in São Tomé and Príncipe

References

 
2020s in São Tomé and Príncipe
Years of the 21st century in São Tomé and Príncipe
Sao Tome and Principe
Sao Tome and Principe